Harry Love (30 May 1871 – 26 March 1942) was an English cricketer.  Love was a right-handed batsman who bowled right-arm slow-medium.  He was born at Hastings, Sussex.

Love made his first-class debut for Sussex against Cambridge University in 1893.  He made four further first-class appearances for the county, the last of which came against the Marylebone Cricket Club in 1894.  In his five first-class matches, he had ten batting innings, scoring a total of 110 runs at an average of 12.22, with a high score of 33.

He died at Ore, Sussex on 26 March 1942.

References

External links
Harry Love at ESPNcricinfo
Harry Love at CricketArchive

1871 births
1942 deaths
Sportspeople from Hastings
English cricketers
Sussex cricketers